The Russian bitterling (Acheilognathus asmussii), or spiny bitterling, is a temperate freshwater fish belonging to the Acheilognathinae sub-family of the  family Cyprinidae.  It originates in the Amur River basin in Asia, and is found in China and Russia. 

It was originally described as Devario asmussii possibly in honor of German entomologist Eduard Assmuss (1838-1882) by Benedykt Dybowski in 1872.
 

The fish will grow in length up to 16 centimetres (6 in).  It lives in a temperate climate in water with a temperature range of 18 °C to 22 °C (64 °F to 72 °F).  It is of commercial importance for public aquariums.

When spawning, female hides eggs inside Cristaria mussels and the male fertilizes them externally.  The pair do not guard the eggs.

References 

 

Acheilognathus
Taxa named by Benedykt Dybowski
Fish described in 1872